Vinyan is a 2008 British-French-Belgian-Australian dramahorror film directed and co-written by Fabrice du Welz and starring Emmanuelle Béart, Rufus Sewell, and Julie Dreyfus. The film premiered at the Venice Film Festival on 30 August 2008.

Reviews towards the film were slightly positive, receiving an aggregated score of 56% from Rotten Tomatoes.

Plot
Jeanne and Paul are a wealthy couple who lost their son, Joshua, in the Boxing Day Christmas tsunami of 2004. Six months later, having stayed over in Thailand, they view a film at an orphanage fund-raiser made by Kimberly Park,
just back from the Andaman Coast, of Moken and Salone natives in the South Tanintharyi division. A restricted area only accessible by boats through a triad of Thaksin Gao who has military ties that smuggles girls to bars in Myanmar. Jeanne sees a vague figure in the distance she believes to be Josh. Discouraged by Jeanne's lead, Paul gives in to contacting the triad's leader Thaksin Gao and hiring one of his boats for an exorbitant 'one-time' fee. At first taken to a false decoy in the Mergui Archipelago where male orphans, the females not present, cast balloons at night to ward of the vinyan spirits, the French couple is further misled, as indicated by pointing on a map, to an uninhabited island south of Macleod Island (west of Zadetkale Island) where, their resources depleted, find themselves equally lost in a region of lost male orphans.

Cast
 Emmanuelle Béart as Jeanne Bellmer
 Rufus Sewell as Paul Bellmer
 Petch Osathanugrah as Thaksin Gao
 Julie Dreyfus as Kim

Release
The film first appeared in North America at the Toronto International Film Festival, where it premiered on 5 September 2008.

External links 
  
 Press Kit
 
 
 

2008 films
2000s English-language films
English-language French films
Films set in Thailand
2008 thriller drama films
2000s psychological drama films
2000s psychological horror films
2008 psychological thriller films
Films set in 2004
2000s buddy films
Films set in Myanmar
2008 horror films
British buddy films
British drama films
French drama films
Australian drama films
Belgian drama films
Films directed by Fabrice Du Welz
2008 drama films
2000s British films
2000s French films